John Whitworth House is a historic home located in Richmond, Virginia.  It was built in 1857, and is a two-story, three bay, Greek Revival style frame dwelling with a low hipped roof.  The house was purchased by noted landscape architect Charles F. Gillette in 1923, and subsequently remodeled in the Colonial Revival style. The property includes a formal garden designed by Gillette.

It was listed on the National Register of Historic Places in 1999.

References

Houses on the National Register of Historic Places in Virginia
Greek Revival houses in Virginia
Colonial Revival architecture in Virginia
Houses completed in 1857
Houses in Richmond, Virginia
National Register of Historic Places in Richmond, Virginia
1857 establishments in Virginia